Narang, Kunar, Afghanistan نرنګ in Pashto and Persian is situated in the central part of Kunar Province, Afghanistan south of Asadabad. It is surrounded by high mountains and the Kunar River. The population is 36,700 (2014). The district center is the village of  Kuz Narang at 742 m altitude. It is the kunar 2nd largest district regarding Agriculture Land. The irrigation system is under rehabilitation. The land is in much good condition and fertile. The irrigation system is almost the best in Kunar province. About 75% of the people are educated. The famous villages are: 1: Bar-Narhang 2: Kotkay 3: Badel dara 4: kuz-Narhang 5: Lamatak 6: dandona 7: Char qala 8: kodo ; etc.

Geographical Information for Narang

Place name: Narang
Latitude: 34° 46' 47" N
Longitude: 71° 07' 00" E
Feature description: town
Area/state: Kunar
Population range of place: is under 1000
Country: Afghanistan
Country ISO code: AF

See also
 Narang night raid
 COP Badel

External links
popularmilitary.com portal
AIMS District Map
Vlasenko Map i42-12, and old highly detailed Russian map of the area

Districts of Kunar Province